The Well Dressed Explorer (1962) is a Miles Franklin Award-winning novel by Australian author Thea Astley.  This novel shared the award with The Cupboard Under the Stairs by George Turner.

Plot summary

The novel follows journalist, George Brewster, who moves from city to city, from empty love affair to empty love affair, until he dies. He is married, but faithless to his wife...and is ultimately a "pathetic figure".

Themes

The themes of this novel are common to Astley's novels: "the hurts inflicted inadvertently and deliberately on others, the terrible shallowness underlying the inability to identify imaginatively with others, and the destruction of others and of the self by wrongly conceived actions."

Notes

References

Middlemiss.org
Taylor, Cheryl and Perkins, Elizabeth (2007) "Warm words: North Queensland writing" in Patrick Buckridge and Elizabeth McKay (ed.) By the Book: A Literary History of Queensland, St Lucia, University of Queensland Press 

1962 Australian novels
Miles Franklin Award-winning works
Novels by Thea Astley